JJ or jj may refer to:

Arts and entertainment

Film and television 
 J.J. Evans or J.J., a character in the 1970s sitcom Good Times
 Jennifer Jareau or JJ, a character on Criminal Minds
 "JJ", an episode of Skins series 4
 JJ DiMeo, a character on Speechless
 John Diggle, Jr., a character from the TV series Arrow nicknamed "J.J."
 JJ, nickname of the title character of Jamie Johnson, a British children's TV series
 "JJ" (Skins series 3), a 2009 episode of Skins series 3
 JJ, the production code for the 1967 Doctor Who serial The Macra Terror
 Jean-Jacques Leroy, a character in the 2016 anime Yuri on Ice

Music 
 "J.J.", a song on the soundtrack of the video game L.A. Noire
 JJ (Swedish band)
 JJ, a band featuring English singer Jan Johnston
 J.J.!, an album by J. J. Johnson
 Abbreviation for Latin Jesu Juva, used by Johann Sebastian Bach at the beginning of his compositions

Other media
 JJ (magazine), a fashion magazine
 JJ (video game), a video game developed and published by Square Co., Ltd.

People

 Jermaine Jenas (born 1983), retired English professional footballer
John Jay (1756–1829), American diplomat and judge
Junaid Jamshed or JJ (1964–2016), Pakistani recording artist and religious figure
 Justo Justo or JJ (1941–2012), Filipino columnist and news presenter
 Robert Jay (judge) (born 1959), noted in court reports as "Jay J"
 J.J. Eubanks (born 1968), American basketball player
 JJ Lehto (born Jyrki Juhani Järvilehto, 1966), Finnish motor racing driver
 J.J. Valberg (1936), British-American philosopher
 J.J. Webster (1898–1965), American politician
 Joanna Jędrzejczyk or JJ (born 1987), Polish MMA fighter and former UFC strawweight champion
 Jerry John Rawlings (1947-2020), Head of state of Ghana from 1981 to 2001

Other uses
 Jj coupling, a form of angular momentum coupling
 JJ, a brassiere measurement in the UK
 LATAM Brasil, formerly TAM Airlines (IATA code JJ)
 J/Z (New York City Subway service), formerly JJ
 JJ, abbreviation for plural judges, justices
 , rapid trains on the Jōban Line in Japan
 Jilly Juice, a fermented drink and a form of alternative medicine
John Jay Hall, a dormitory at Columbia University

See also 
 Jay Jay the Jet Plane, a children's television cartoon series
 Jay Jay, a 2003 Tamil film
 Jay-J (born 1969), American house music disc jockey
 Double J (disambiguation)
 J & J (disambiguation)
 JJS (disambiguation)
 GG (disambiguation)